The Somali Football Federation (SFF) (was founded in 1951, and it is one of the national administrative governing bodies of the Confederation of African Football (CAF) responsible for organizing and controlling the sport of football and its competitions (the first, second, and third divisions, as well as the Cup) in the Federal Republic of Somalia, as well as the Somalia national football team. In 1962, the SFF became a FIFA member. It later joined CAF in 1968, and the Union of Arab Football Associations (UAFA) in 1974. The SFF is responsible for organizing matches between local teams and enforcing rules and regulations of the game during matches.

Crests

Management
Management:
President
Khalid Hassan

Vice President
 Othman Moalin;General Secretary
GHULED Alisaid
Othman MoalinTreasurer
GHULED Alisaid

Coaching
Coaching
Technical Director
Awil Ismail Mohamed

Men's Coach
Hendrik Pieter de Jongh

Assistant Coach
Murad

Women's Coach
HUSSEIN ALI Abdule

Media Officer
ABOKAR Shafii

Futsal Coordinator
N/A

Referee Coordinator
MOHAMED AHMED Ali

Committee Members
Abdiqani Said - Beach Soccer Committee

Referees
Referees
MOHAMED HAGI Hassan 	(international since 2014)
OLAD ARAB Bashir 	(international since 2004)
WIISH Hagi Yabarow 	(international since 2011)

Assistant Referees
ABDI Hamza Hagi 	        (international since 2013)
ALI MOHAMUD Ali Mohamud MAHAD 	(international since 2014)
AWEYS Abdulahi Sheikh 	        (international since 2014)
MOHAMED Mussa Abdulahi 	(international since 2014)
OMAR ABUKAR Salah 	        (international since 2001)
SULEIMAN Bashir Sh. Abdi 	(international since 2013)

Agents
N/A

See also
Somalia Cup
Somalia League
Somalia national beach soccer team
Somalia national football team

Notes

References
CAF Online - Somalia

External links
FIFA - Somalia

Somalia
Football in Somalia
Sports organizations established in 1951
1951 establishments in Somalia